Attila Korpás (born 1 September 1945) is a Hungarian-German former professional tennis player.

Born in Budapest, Korpás represented Hungary in a Davis Cup tie against Brazil in 1965. 

By the 1970s he was playing under the West German flag and had a noted win over Jimmy Connors at Nice in 1972. In 1973 he was a quarter-finalist at both the Berlin and Dutch Opens. He featured in the main draw of the French Open on three occasions, most successfully in 1974 when he made the third round.

See also
List of Hungary Davis Cup team representatives

References

External links
 
 
 

1945 births
Living people
Hungarian male tennis players
West German male tennis players
Hungarian emigrants to Germany
Tennis players from Budapest